Madurai East railway station is a small railway station in Madurai district, Tamil Nadu. Its code is MES. It serves Madurai city. The station consists of only 1 platform which spans 325 meters and can able to handle upto 18 coached train. The platform is not well sheltered. It lacks many facilities including water and sanitation.

Major trains

References

External links 
 Southern Railways - Official Website

Buildings and structures in Madurai
Railway stations in Madurai district
Railway stations in Madurai
Transport in Madurai
Madurai railway division